Food pairing (or flavor pairing) is a method of identifying which foods go well together from a flavor standpoint, often based on individual tastes, popularity, availability of ingredients, and traditional cultural practices.

From a food science perspective, foods may be said to combine well with one another when they share key flavor components. One such process was trademarked as "Foodpairing" by the company of the same name.

Examples
Examples of traditional flavour pairings in food include:

 Bacon and cabbage
 Duck à l'orange
 Ham and eggs
 Hawaiian pizza
 Liver and onions
 Peanut butter and jelly
 Pork chops and applesauce

Food science 

Experimenting with salty ingredients and chocolate around the year 2000, Heston Blumenthal, the chef of The Fat Duck, concluded that caviar and white chocolate were a perfect match. To find out why, he contacted a flavor scientist at the flavor manufacturer Firmenich. By comparing the flavor analysis of both foods, they found that caviar and white chocolate had major flavor components in common. At that time, they formed the hypothesis that different foods would combine well together when they shared major flavor components, and the trademarked concept of "Foodpairing" was created.

This Foodpairing method is asserted to aid recipe design, and it has provided new ideas for food combinations which are asserted to be theoretically sound on the basis of their flavor. It provides possible food combinations, which are solely based on the intrinsic properties of the different food products; these combinations are based on the flavor compounds that are present in the products. It also can result in unusual combinations (e.g. endives in a dessert, white chocolate and caviar, or chocolate and cauliflower). While unusual, many people find these combinations enjoyable because the combined food products have flavor components in common. Additionally, it is able to provide a scientific, modern basis for the success of traditionally settled food combinations. It is suggested that these traditions can then be overtaken by newer, better pairings.

In 2009, the Flanders Taste foundation organized a gastronomic symposium and "The Flemish Primitives" that was dedicated to Foodpairing.

Methodology 
The "Foodpairing" method starts with a chemical analysis of a food. The aroma compounds are determined with the aid of gas chromatography, which in most cases is coupled with a mass spectrometer (GC-MS). The odorants are also quantified with other techniques. Key odorants can be identified by comparing the concentrations of the odorants with their respective flavor threshold. Key odorants are the compounds that a human will effectively smell. They are defined as every compound that is present in concentrations higher than their specific flavor threshold.

For example, coffee contains 700 different aroma compounds, but there are only a few compounds important for the smell of coffee as most of them are present in concentrations that may not be perceptible with the human nose, i.e. they are present in concentrations lower than their flavor threshold.

The key odorants are essential towards composing the flavor profile of the given product. The resultant flavor profile is screened against a database of other foods.  Products which have flavor components in common with the original ingredient are selected and retained. These matching products could be combined with the original ingredient. With this information on possible matches, a Foodpairing tree graph is built.

The essence of Foodpairing is to combine different foods that share the same major flavor components. Comparing the flavors of individual ingredients can result in new and unexpected combinations, such as strawberries paired with peas. This combination was adopted by Sang Hoon Decembre, the chef of L’Air du temps in Belgium.

See also

Flavor threshold

Ingredient-flavor network
Molecular gastronomy
Molecular mixology
The Flavour Thesaurus
Whisky with food
Wine and food matching

References

Food science
Flavors